Mundakkal, also spelt Mundackal, is an important residential area and industrial hub situated in the city of Kollam, Kerala, India. The place is considered as the capital of India's cashew processing activities. Kerala State Cashew Development Corporation Limited(KSCDC) and Cashew Export Promotion Council of India(CEPCI) are headquartered at Mundakkal in Kollam city. It is an important tourist place in the city and a part of Downtown Kollam which gained in significance because of the presence of a flourishing beach. During 'Karkidaka Vavubali', thousands of devotees arrive on the beach to perform the Vavubali Tharpanam. Vavubali is an important ritual observed by Hindus in Kerala in the month of Karkidakam. The ritual involves people offering Bali to the departed souls. The ritual is performed by men, women, and children.

Location 
 Kollam Junction railway station - 3.3 km
 Andamukkam City Bus Stand - 3.7 km
 Kollam KSRTC Bus Station - 5 km
 Kollam Port - 4.9 km
 Chinnakada - 4.2 km
 Thangassery - 5.5 km
 Paravur railway station - 19.5 km

Importance of Mundakkal 
Mundakkal is a very important place for Kollam city as so many important institutions and tourism centres in the city are situated in and around Mundakkal. Mundakkal Beach, Cashew Export Promotion Council of India(CEPC), Kerala State Cashew Development Corporation Ltd.(KSCDC), SIDCO Industrial Estate & raw material depot. etc. are situated at Mundakkal.

Kerala State Cashew Development Corporation Limited 

The Kerala State Cashew Development Corporation Limited(KSCDC) is a model employer in the field of cashew industry mainly to protect the interest of workers and to provide maximum employment to its workers and to give statutory benefits like minimum wages, bonus, etc. prevailing in the cashew industry. It is headquartered in Kollam city - The Cashew Capital of the World. The head office is situated at Cashew House, Mundakkal in Kollam City, Kerala. KSCDC was incorporated in July 1969 and started Commercial activities in the year 1971 as a company fully owned by the Government of Kerala.  Corporation has now more than a turn over of Rs. 250 crores.

Cashew Export Promotion Council of India 

Cashew Export Promotion Council of India(CEPC) was established by the Government of India in the year 1955, with the active cooperation of the cashew industry with the object of promoting exports of cashew kernels and cashew nut shell liquid from India. It is headquartered in Mundakkal, Kollam in the state of Kerala - Cashew Capital of the World. The Council serves as an intermediary between importers of Cashew Kernels and exporters who are members of the council. The council is also supposed to deal with any disputes on exports/imports arising on account of quality standards, breach of contractual obligations, etc. It undertakes numerous activities, such as organizing global buyer-seller meets, organizing studies on the nutritional aspects of cashew and providing support to cashew processors and exporters for improving infrastructure.

Mundakkal Beach 

The beach is one of the 25 potential beaches for tourism development in Kerala. Other major beaches in the district include Paravur Thekkumbhagam, Pozhikara, Kollam Beach and Thirumullavaram, which are all close by.

Mundakkal Industrial Estate 
Kerala SIDCO is running an Industrial estate in Mundakkal. Pieces of land, with power and water supply and other infrastructure, have been divided into individual sites. The sites make up industrial estates, part of the government's initiative to develop the small and medium enterprise sector and address the issue of unemployment

Urban primary health centre 

An experimental venture is done by National Urban Health Mission in mid-2014. But it's a great help for the civilians and the people in nearby poor homes in Mundakkal. This health centre is located just near Thumpara temple.

See also 
 Kollam
 Mundakkal Beach
 Kollam Beach
 Chinnakada
 Andamukkam City Bus Stand
 Kadappakada
 Asramam Maidan

References

External links

Neighbourhoods in Kollam
Cashew processing hubs in Kollam